The Brooklyn Woman's Club was an organization founded in 1869 and incorporated in 1871. Laura Curtis Bullard cofounded the organization along with her friend Elizabeth Tilton and others, and served as its first president. In 1912, the club moved to 114 Pierrepont Street in Brooklyn Heights and shared the building with the Brooklyn Women Suffrage Association and the Civitas Club.

In 1915, Ida Sherwood Coffin (née Willets) served as president. After his election in 1921, President Warren Harding wrote to Mrs. William Hoster, director of social services for the organization, to endorse their work for child welfare in Brooklyn.

In addition to working towards women's suffrage, the club also hosted events such as card games for hundreds of attendees and lectures on world politics and peace advocacy.

Notable people
 Laura Curtis Bullard
 Mariana Wright Chapman
 Elizabeth Tilton

References

External links
 Official website

Women's suffrage advocacy groups in the United States
Women's clubs in the United States
Brooklyn Heights
Women in New York City
History of women in New York City